Buurman is a surname. Notable people with the surname include:

Atse Buurman (born 1982), Dutch cricketer
Eva Buurman (born 1994), Dutch cyclist
Yelmer Buurman (born 1987), Dutch racing driver

See also
Burman 
Burmann